Rock flathead is a common name for several Australian fishes and may refer to:

Cymbacephalus nematophthalmus
Platycephalus laevigatus
Thysanophrys cirronasa